1-Indanone is the organic compound with the formula C6H4(CH2)2CO.  It is one of two isomeric benzocyclopentanones, the other being 2-indanone.  It is a colorless solid. 1-Indanone is a substrate for the enzyme indanol dehydrogenase.

Preparation
It is prepared by oxidation of indane or indene. It can also be prepared by cyclization of phenylpropionic acid.

References

Aromatic ketones